Hibler is a surname. Notable people with the surname include:

Joe Anna Hibler (born 1939), American educator
Mike Hibler (born 1946), American football player
Winston Hibler (1910–1976), American screenwriter, film producer, director, and narrator

English-language surnames